Doris Pinčić (born 4 September 1988) is a Croatian actress and TV and radio presenter. She is known for her role as Lara Božić-Zlatar in the Nova TV series, Larin izbor.

Biography 
She graduated from Academy of acting and puppetry in Osijek. From 2011 to 2013 she was played as protagonist in the series Larin izbor. Upon completion of the series, in 2013 she became a radio host in Narodni Radio.

Personal life 
On 6 September 2013 she married the musician Boris Rogoznica, and on 11 February 2014 gave birth to a son Donat. On 27 June 2018 gave birth to a daughter Gita.

Filmography

Television roles

Movie roles

References

External links

1988 births
Living people
21st-century Croatian actresses
Croatian stage actresses
Croatian film actresses
Croatian television actresses
Actors from Zadar